The Eskay Creek region is a rich gold and silver mining area in the Unuk and Iskut River region on north coastal mountains of British Columbia.

The area was mined by Homestake Mining and then Barrick Gold Corporation. The geology is considered by most workers to be a volcanogenic massive sulfide ore deposit containing gold, silver, copper, zinc, arsenic, antimony and mercury.  The mine produced 3.3 million ounces of gold and 160 million ounces of silver at average grades of 45 g/t gold and 2,224 g/t silver from 1994 -2008.

References

 

Stikine Country